Amorphoscelis austrogermanica is a species of praying mantis found in Namibia, South Africa (KwaZulu-Natal, Transvaal), and East Africa.

See also
List of mantis genera and species

References

Amorphoscelis
Insects described in 1923
Mantodea of Africa